Flia, also known as fli or flija, is a dish in Albanian cuisine. It consists of multiple crêpe-like layers brushed with cream and served with sour cream and butter. The name translates to "sacrifice" (see fli).

March 17 is recognized as "Flia Day" in which families invite their relatives for preparing and eating flia.

Flija requires very simple ingredients: flour, water, butter, yogurt, eggs, oil, nuts and salt. The main ingredients (flour, water and salt) are mixed together until they become like pancake batter. Layers of batter are baked using a saq which is a spherical metal lid used for baking.

See also
Knish

References 

Kosovan cuisine
Albanian cuisine
Pastries